Yukon–Koyukuk Census Area is a census area in the U.S. state of Alaska. As of the 2020 census, the population was 5,343, down from 5,588 in 2010. It is part of the unorganized borough of Alaska and therefore has no borough seat. Its largest communities are the cities of Galena, in the west, and Fort Yukon, in the northeast.

Geography
The area is roughly the same size as the entire U.S. state of Montana, itself the fourth largest state, or the country of Japan, and makes up slightly more than 1/5 of the state of Alaska. The area is bigger than 47 of the other 49 states, with only California and Texas being bigger.

Adjacent boroughs and census areas

 North Slope Borough, Alaska – north
 Southeast Fairbanks Census Area, Alaska – southeast
 Fairbanks North Star Borough, Alaska – southeast
 Denali Borough, Alaska – southeast
 Matanuska-Susitna Borough, Alaska – south
 Bethel Census Area, Alaska – south
 Kusilvak Census Area, Alaska – west
 Nome Census Area, Alaska – west
 Northwest Arctic Borough, Alaska – west
 Yukon Territory, Canada – east

National protected areas

 Arctic National Wildlife Refuge (part)
 Mollie Beattie Wilderness (part)
 Gates of the Arctic National Park and Preserve (part)
 Gates of the Arctic Wilderness (part)
 Innoko National Wildlife Refuge
 Innoko Wilderness
 Kanuti National Wildlife Refuge
 Koyukuk National Wildlife Refuge (part)
 Koyukuk Wilderness (part)
 Noatak National Preserve
 Nowitna National Wildlife Refuge
 Selawik National Wildlife Refuge (part)
 Selawik Wilderness (part)
 Steese National Conservation Area
 White Mountains National Recreation Area
 Yukon–Charley Rivers National Preserve (part)
 Yukon Flats National Wildlife Refuge

Demographics

At the 2000 census there were 6,551 people, 2,309 households, and 1,480 families residing in the census area. The population density was  square miles (km2) per person. It is the least densely populated county-equivalent of all 3,141 county-equivalents of the United States. The racial makeup of the census area was 24.27% White, 0.09% Black or African American, 70.89% Native American, 0.37% Asian, 0.05% Pacific Islander, 0.43% from other races, and 3.91% from two or more races.  1.19% were Hispanic or Latino of any race. 12.95% reported speaking an Athabaskan language at home; of these 35.26% speak Gwich’in and 10.94% speak Koyukon.

Of the 2,309 households 38.90% had children under the age of 18 living with them, 36.90% were married couples living together, 16.90% had a female householder with no husband present, and 35.90% were non-families. 30.50% of households were one person and 6.20% were one person aged 65 or older.  The average household size was 2.81 and the average family size was 3.53.

The age distribution was 35.00% under the age of 18, 8.70% from 18 to 24, 26.90% from 25 to 44, 22.10% from 45 to 64, and 7.30% 65 or older.  The median age was 31 years. For every 100 females, there were 118.60 males.  For every 100 females age 18 and over, there were 122.60 males.

2020 Census

Communities

Cities

 Allakaket
 Anvik
 Bettles
 Fort Yukon
 Galena
 Grayling
 Holy Cross
 Hughes
 Huslia
 Kaltag
 Koyukuk
 McGrath
 Nenana
 Nikolai
 Nulato
 Ruby
 Shageluk
 Tanana

Census-designated places

 Alatna
 Arctic Village
 Beaver
 Birch Creek
 Central
 Chalkyitsik
 Circle
 Coldfoot
 Evansville
 Flat
 Four Mile Road
 Lake Minchumina
 Livengood
 Manley Hot Springs
 Minto
 New Allakaket
 Rampart
 Stevens Village
 Takotna
 Venetie
 Wiseman

Education
School districts include:
 Alaska Gateway School District
 Galena City School District
 Iditarod Area School District
 Nenana City School District
 Tanana City School District
 Yukon Flats School District
 Yukon–Koyukuk School District

See also
 List of airports in Yukon–Koyukuk Census Area
 Crow Lake (Alaska)

References

External links

 
 

 
Alaska census areas